Avedis Zildjian Company, simply known as Zildjian, is a musical instrument manufacturer and the largest cymbal and drumstick maker in the world

Zildjian is also a surname. It may refer to:

related to cymbals
Avedis Zildjian (17th century), an Armenian Ottoman metalsmith and alchemist
Haroutune Zildjian son of Avedis Zildjian, continued his father's worked and then passed it to his own son 
Avedis (2nd) Zildjian named in his grandfather's name. 
Kerop Zildjian, Avedis'brother 
Haroutune (2nd) Zildjian
Aram Zildjian
Avedis (3rd) Zildjian. For all of above, see Avedis Zildjian Company#Beginnings and Avedis Zildjian Company#1900sBeginnings

Armand Zildjian (1921-2002), Armenian-American manufacturer of cymbals and the head of the Avedis Zildjian Company
Robert Zildjian (1923–2013), Armenian-American manufacturer of cymbals, the founder of Sabian Cymbals, the second-largest manufacturer of cymbals in the world

others
Daniel Zildjian Benitez or Zild Benitez (born 1997), Filipino musician, producer, and singer-songwriter